Zenith University College is a privately owned university in Ghana established in December 2001.
At first Zenith was a tutorial college for some foreign universities.
Zenith opened as a tertiary educational institution in November 2005, and was accredited to offer diploma, undergraduate and postgraduate programmes in Ghana.

In 2011 the Chartered Institute of Taxation, Ghana signed a memorandum of understanding with Zenith to provide tuition in taxation for students wanting to enter the profession.

Programs 

 Undergraduate 
 Postgraduate
 Professional Courses
 Diploma Programs

Undergraduate programs 

 School of Business
 Faculty of Law
 Ghana Law - accredited by National Accreditation Board - Ghana
 London Law - accredited by the University of London - UK
 School of Computing  and Information  Technology

Diploma Programs 

 Diploma in Business Administration
 Diploma in Law

Postgraduate Programs 

 General Management

 Marketing

 Human Resource Management

 Banking and Finance

Professional Courses 

 Association of Business Executives (ABE)
 Confederation of Tourism and Hospitality (CTH)
 Chartered Institute of Logistics and Transport (CILT)
 Chartered Institute of Marketing (CIM)
 Association of Chartered Certified Accountants (ACCA)

References

Universities in Ghana
Educational institutions established in 2001
2001 establishments in Ghana